Blauvelt House may refer to:

Blauvelt House (Franklin Lakes, New Jersey), listed on the National Register of Historic Places in Bergen County, New Jersey 
Blauvelt House (Harrington Park, New Jersey), listed on the National Register of Historic Places in Bergen County, New Jersey 
Blauvelt House (Norwood, New Jersey), listed on the National Register of Historic Places in Bergen County, New Jersey 
Blauvelt-Demarest House, Hillsdale, New Jersey, listed on the National Register of Historic Places in Bergen County, New Jersey
Cairns-Whitten-Blauvelt House, Wyckoff, New Jersey, listed on the National Register of Historic Places in Bergen County, New Jersey 
Haring-Blauvelt House, Northvale, New Jersey, listed on the National Register of Historic Places in Bergen County, New Jersey
Haring-Blauvelt-Demarest House, River Vale, New Jersey, listed on the National Register of Historic Places in Bergen County, New Jersey
Blauvelt House (New City, New York), listed on the National Register of Historic Places in Rockland County, New York